The Surgeon General of California is the leading spokesperson on matters of public health within the State of California.  The Surgeon General is one of only five State Surgeons General in the United States.  The office was created on January 7, 2019, by Governor Gavin Newsom and requires confirmation from the California State Senate.

The first Surgeon General was Dr. Nadine Burke Harris, who served from February 11, 2019, to February 11, 2022. The Surgeon General is one key component of the Governor's "California for All" agenda which includes a proposed $1.7 billion in funding for expanded early childhood education and early interventions. Governor Newsom appointed two National Experts in Child Development to be Key Leaders in the effort to help the youngest Californians.

On August 25, 2022, Governor Gavin Newsom appointed Dr. Diana Ramos as the California Surgeon General.

Responsibilities 

 Marshal the insights and energy of medical professionals, public health experts, public servants, and everyday Californians to solve our most pressing health challenges with surgical focus.
 Address Toxic Stress and Social Determinants of health with experts including State and local health officials.
 Identify and Implement Solutions proven by our best science with Evidence Based Practices to combat Toxic Stress and Social Determinants of Health.
 Lead the Californians, world's leading experts (many of whom live in California) and State and Local Health Officials to proactively addressing root causes of toxic stress and social determinants of health, using evidence based practice.
 Build Resilience within communities in California, especially those with increased inequity in health care access and have issues related to socioeconomic status, race, discrimination, and factors that play a role in triggering toxic stress for children and adults.
 Address the most pressing health concerns by leading Medical and Policy Experts to effectively address and solve serious health challenges rooted in early social determinants of health, which are serious and inequitable, and disproportionately impact low-income Californians and communities of color.
 Address the upstream factors that lead to the pernicious, but least addressed, health challenges that lead to chronic and acute conditions that are far more difficult and expensive to treat.
 Address the overwhelming scientific consensus of the upstream factors, including toxic stress and the social determinants of health, are the root causes of many of the most harmful and persistent health challenges facing Californians.
 Pioneer ways to treat stress in children to impact the future of disease, and prevent long-term effects of toxic stress through prevention and healing.
 Develop and equip every medical professional with the Screening Tools do diagnose and treat Toxic Stress. 
 Address Racism through interdisciplinary partnerships with other organizations that have developed campaigns against racism on Child & Adolescent Health to Improve Health Equity.
 Educate Pediatricians to the fact that they are poised to prevent and respond to environmental circumstances that undermine child health.
 Address healthcare from a preventive, rather than reactive, frame reflects a keen appreciation of the latest science as well as a deep commitment to the health of California children and families.
Develop tools and protocols for the screening of children for trauma, within the Early and Periodic Screening, Diagnosis, and Treatment (EPSDT) benefit, consistent with existing law.
 Implement the Department of Health Care Services plan to provide screenings to everyone on MediCal younger than 65 at least once every three years, beginning in January 2020.

Top Priorities 

 Raise awareness that Adverse Childhood Experiences, like emotional abuse or witnessing domestic violence, can increase the risk of major health problems like asthma, diabetes and heart disease.
 Use the science, because the science is clear: early intervention improves outcomes.
 Equip every medical professional with Screening Tools to diagnose and treat Toxic Stress.

History 
The Surgeon General of California was created with the signing of Executive Order N-02-19—one of the first acts taken by Governor Gavin Newsom on his first day in office—on January 7, 2019.  At the time of the office's creation, the Office of the Surgeon General was the first of its kind in California and one of only four on a state level in the United States.

On January 21, 2019, Governor Newsom appointed Dr. Nadine Burke Harris to be California's first-ever surgeon general.  She took office on February 11, 2019, and resigned her position on February 11, 2022. Shortly after the new Surgeon General was appointed, Dr. Nadine Burke Harris went on a Statewide Listening Tour.

Increasing Awareness of Toxic Stress and ACES (Adverse Childhood Experiences Study) 
Dr. Nadine Burke Harris has given many speeches and testimony to the impact of Toxic Stress on Children and how it impacts their future.

A PBS NewsHour opinion piece highlighted Nadine Burke Harris experience with Toxic Stress and how it is under-diagnosed in children.

A DISTURBING Washington Post video with Nadine Burke Harris explains Toxic Stress with powerful visuals and sound added to Dr. Burke Harris' explanation.

There are many websites and toolkits to better understand Toxic Stress and Adverse Childhood Experiences and their impact on health over a lifetime including ACES Too High, Harvard Center on the Developing Child,

Dr. Nadine Burke Harris has given multiple talks and had conversations that have been made public and available to the public on Toxic Stress including a famous Ted Talk that addresses Toxic Stress from a Public Health standpoint.

Trauma Informed Care and Strengthening Resilience. 
Necessary resources for medical, behavioral and educational professionals include resources to provide Trauma Informed Care.  Systems that work with children and their parents and extended families will need to create Trauma-Informed Systems where the children and their families are supported by staff who are also supported while caring for survivors of trauma.

A service system with a trauma-informed perspective is one in which agencies, programs, and service providers:

 Routinely screen for trauma exposure and related symptoms.
 Use evidence-based, culturally responsive assessment and treatment for traumatic stress and associated mental health symptoms.
 Make resources available to children, families, and providers on trauma exposure, its impact, and treatment.
 Engage in efforts to strengthen the resilience and protective factors of children and families impacted by and vulnerable to trauma.
 Address parent and caregiver trauma and its impact on the family system.
 Emphasize continuity of care and collaboration across child-service systems. 
 Maintain an environment of care for staff that addresses, minimizes, and treats secondary traumatic stress, and that increases staff wellness.

These activities are rooted in an understanding that trauma-informed agencies, programs, and service providers:

 Build meaningful partnerships that create mutuality among children, families, caregivers, and professionals at an individual and organizational level.
 Address the intersections of trauma with culture, history, race, gender, location, and language, acknowledge the compounding impact of structural inequity, and are responsive to the unique needs of diverse communities.

Challenges of Children Traumatized by Systems (i.e. Justice System, Border Patrol, Foster Care System, ICE, etc.) 
Children who come to the attention of the juvenile justice system are a challenging and under-served population, with high rates of exposure to trauma.

Unaccompanied Migrant Children who may have Complex trauma prior to encounters with systems like Border Patrol or the Foster Care system.

Instituting Proper funding and care for Early Childhood Development and Intervention to address Social Determinants of Health will need to be a key part of building resilience into the systems that deal with children, especially in Early Childhood may become part of the overall plan for California and be supported by the Surgeon General.

In a Q&A Dr. Burke Harris was asked, "Gov. Newsom has made funding early education one of his highest priorities. How do you plan on incorporating trauma-informed teaching into the overall effort?"

In response she answered, "We’re understanding more than we ever had before the role of experience and environment in early childhood in shaping lifelong health outcomes. That is the data and research we are seeing across the board. So, when you look at something that is such a huge public health issue then we must recognize that to implement public health solutions we need to be engaging across sectors.

So, in our educational system, in our health system, in our justice system — across the board — we need to have broad-scale and coordinated efforts to address the impact of early adversity on health and development. Healthcare and early education go hand-in-hand."

Trauma as a Toxin or Public Health Problem 
"Imagine identifying a toxin so potent it could rewire a child’s brain and erode his immune system. A substance that, in high doses, tripled the risk of heart disease and lung cancer and reduced life expectancy by 20 years.

And then realizing that tens of millions of American children had been exposed.

Nadine Burke Harris, is a leading voice in a movement trying to transform our understanding of how the traumatic experiences that affect children, can trigger serious physical and mental illness, and looking at it using epidemiology, like John Snow did in 1800s London.

Decades of research that has found that children who endure sustained stresses in their day-to-day lives undergo biochemical changes to their brains and bodies that can dramatically increase their risk of developing serious health problems, including heart disease, lung cancer, asthma, and depression."

List of surgeons general

References

State constitutional officers of California